Mal-e Kharg-e Shemali (also Romanized as  Mal-e Kharg-e Shemālī; also known as Malakeh, Mal-e Khar, Mal-e Kharg, Mal Kharg, and Mol-e Kharg) is a village in Howmeh Rural District, in the Central District of Deyr County, Bushehr Province, Iran. At the 2006 census, its population was 50, in 10 families.

References 

Populated places in Deyr County